Vít Christov (born August 30, 1996) is a Czech professional ice hockey player. He is currently playing for HC Oceláři Třinec of the Czech Extraliga.

Christov made his Czech Extraliga debut playing with HC Oceláři Třinec during the 2014-15 Czech Extraliga season.

References

External links

1996 births
Living people
HC Oceláři Třinec players
Czech ice hockey forwards
Sportspeople from Třinec
Motor České Budějovice players
HC Frýdek-Místek players